Rutherford High School may refer to:

Rutherford High School (New Jersey), Rutherford, New Jersey, United States
Rutherford High School (Florida), Springfield, Florida, United States
Rutherford Technology High School, Maitland, New South Wales, Australia
The former name of Rutherford College, Auckland, New Zealand

See also
Rutherford School (disambiguation)